"Port in a Storm" is the 12th and final episode of the second season of the HBO original series The Wire. The episode was written by David Simon from a story by David Simon & Ed Burns and was directed by Robert F. Colesberry. It originally aired on August 24, 2003.

Plot
When Frank fails to return home from his meeting with The Greek, Nick goes looking for him. He watches as Frank's lifeless, mutilated body is retrieved from the harbor, with a severe throat wound close to decapitation. After Nick's father Louis has him turn himself in, Freamon brings him to the detail. The Greek and Vondas discuss the discovery of Frank’s corpse, and whether Nick will turn on them. Disclosing to the audience that Nick in fact knows virtually nothing about their identities- Vondas is operating under a pseudonym, and “The Greek” is in fact not actually Greek at all- the mysterious pair agree to leave Nick alone, and walk away from Baltimore. The stevedores union is decertified and seized when the union members, including Ott, stand in solidarity behind the deceased Frank's re-election as treasurer, in defiance of the FBI. Stringer visits Brother Mouzone at the hospital and promises to catch whoever was responsible for his shooting. Mouzone coolly informs Stringer that he needs no assistance and will find those responsible on his own. Stringer incriminates himself when he jumps at Mouzone's use of plurals when describing his attackers.

Bubbles and Johnny are arrested by Officer Michael Santangelo for stealing medical supplies from an ambulance. In exchange for getting the charges dropped, Bubbles tells Greggs and McNulty about Mouzone's shooting of Cheese at the Barksdale towers, and Stringer's collaboration with the East Side drug kingpins. The detectives watch the towers and see the two crews working alongside one another. Meanwhile, Omar and Butchie realize that the shooting with Mouzone was a set-up by Stringer. Omar vows to get revenge. Vondas meets Proposition Joe and assures him that even though he's leaving Baltimore, he'll have new people coming in to restart their operation. In prison, Avon begrudgingly agrees to work with Joe, but is noticeably unhappy with Stringer. The subsequent meeting between Stringer and Joe is photographed by Greggs and McNulty.

Daniels blackmails Valchek into not pressing charges against Prez, pointing to witness statements given by the detail and the FBI. Nick gives up information on Vondas, Eton and Serge. He also identifies The Greek from McNulty's serendipitous photo but is unable to give them anything beyond that. The detail puts Nick under protection. Fitz decides to check on Agent Koutris and is dismayed to learn that he has been transferred to the FBI's counterterrorism office in Washington. When Herc and Carver learn they have been left out of the loop about Nick's cooperation, they conclude that Daniels is not properly using them in the detail. Carver tells Daniels that he will request a transfer to Colvin's district in West Baltimore before storming out.

Freamon, Bunk, and Beadie travel to the Port of Philadelphia to investigate the murdered crewman. Using security tapes, they place Serge at the scene of the killing. Under questioning, Serge is forced to admit that he was present when Vondas killed the crewman in retaliation for his murder of the Jane Does. Elsewhere, Greggs' downbeat attitude about parenthood causes tensions with Cheryl. The FBI places Nick and his family in protective custody in a basic motel. The next day, Nick leaves the hotel and is unable to find a day's work at the docks. Under pressure from Daniels, Serge reveals a location that The Greek uses for meetings. Daniels moves on The Greek's hotel, unaware that Vondas and The Greek are already leaving the country. With the port case over, Greggs and McNulty convince Daniels to use his new unit to go after Stringer and Joe. Fitz tells Daniels that the leak was not from his agency, but rather likely from the FBI's counterterrorism office, who would find The Greek's vast network to be valuable for the War on Terror. Valchek opens a letter from Australia with a photo of the surveillance van that is still being transported around the globe. Valchek sadly whispers "rest in peace" in Polish.

In the closing montage, Nick mourns his uncle's death by staring over the water near the docks; U.S. Marshals close the union hall; Johnny Fifty urinates on The Greek's last container full of drugs and makes an obscene gesture at the watching cops; Pearlman prosecutes Eton and Horseface; Rawls and Landsman celebrate the clearance of their Jane Does; Ziggy serves his time; Davis and other politicians break ground on the condominiums that will replace the grain pier; Beadie returns to the port police; Freamon dismantles the detail's investigative board, leaving up the photo of The Greek; Frog's crew drives an old woman to sell her home; Poot and Puddin watch the police patrol their territory; the stevedores get drunk on a street corner; and Joe takes a shipment of drugs from the back of a truck carrying prostitutes. The season concludes as Nick walks away and rain begins to pour.

Production

Title reference
The title refers to the turmoil taking place at the port, as foreshadowed by the previous episode title Storm Warnings. The "storm" includes the death of Frank Sobotka, the progression of the trials of several port characters as well as U.S. Marshals taking over the checker's union hall.

The title is also a reference to the proverb: "Any port in a storm". The proverb tries to say that in an emergency, people will take any help from any source, regardless of the unpleasantness of it. This could refer to Bubbles asking Kima for help (and vice versa), Nick talking to the Greeks for advice and then turning to the detail, Avon accepting Prop Joe's stash, Serge flipping with the police, and the special crimes unit using the resources of the FBI.

Epigraph

In this quote said by him to an airport ticket booking agent, The Greek refers to the fact that everything they do is for the business they are running, from the manipulation of the ports to their own names and lives. They are twisting the world to meet their own ends but they are also an institution in themselves, connected to the other institutions such as the FBI, the shipping docks, immigration, etc. It also hints at the fact that the crime business cycle will continue.

Music

Hank Williams' "A Mansion on the Hill" plays when Beadie and Bunk visit the Philadelphia port security office. A cover version of Creedence Clearwater Revival's "Have You Ever Seen the Rain?" by Joan Jett plays at the bar where the detail drown their sorrows. The Steve Earle song "I Feel Alright" plays over the closing montage. Earle has a small recurring role as a drug counselor named Walon, but does not appear in this season. Earle also sings Tom Waits' "Way Down in the Hole" for the fifth season opening credits of the show.

Credits

Starring cast

Guest stars
Seth Gilliam as Detective Ellis Carver
Domenick Lombardozzi as Detective Thomas "Herc" Hauk
Jim True-Frost as Detective Roland "Prez" Pryzbylewski (credited, but does not appear)
James Ransone as Ziggy Sobotka
Pablo Schreiber as Nick Sobotka
Melanie Nicholls-King as Cheryl
Michael Potts as Brother Mouzone
Bill Raymond as The Greek
Michael K. Williams as Omar Little
Maria Broom as Marla Daniels
Al Brown as Major Stanislaus Valchek
Robert F. Chew as Proposition Joe
Kristin Proctor as Aimee
Tray Chaney as Malik "Poot" Carr
Robert Hogan as Louis Sobotka
Michael Salconi as Officer Michael Santangelo
Charley Scalies as Thomas "Horseface" Pakusa
Delaney Williams as Sergeant Jay Landsman
Chris Ashworth as Sergei Malatov
Richard Burton as Shamrock
Leo Fitzpatrick as Johnny Weeks
Jeffrey Fugitt as Officer Claude Diggins
S. Robert Morgan as Butchie
Luray Cooper as Nat Coxson
Kelvin Davis as La La
Bus Howard as Ott
Lance Irwin as Maui
Jeffrey Pratt Gordon as Johnny "Fifty" Spamanto
Benay Berger as FBI Supervisor Amanda Reese
Tommy Hahn as FBI Special Agent Salmond
Kevin McKelvy as FBI Agent
Doug Olear as FBI Special Agent Terrance "Fitz" Fitzhugh
William L. Thomas as FBI Agent
Isiah Whitlock, Jr. as Senator Clay Davis

Uncredited appearances
Brian Anthony Wilson as Detective Vernon Holley
Michael Willis as Andy Krawczyk
Lev Gorn as Eton Ben-Eleazer
Brook Yeaton as "White" Mike McArdle
Gary "D-Reign" as Frog
De'Rodd Hearns as Puddin
DeAndre McCullough as Lamar
Richard Pelzman as Little Big Roy
Doug Lory as Big Roy
J. Valenteen Gregg as Chess
Jon Garcia as Ringo
Paul Majors as Officer MacGraul
Schuster Vance as Walt Stokes

Reception
The Futon Critic named it the 16th best episode of television in 2003, saying the series "once again reminded us happy endings are all too rare in the 'real' world with its second season finale."

References

External links
"Port in a Storm" at HBO.com

The Wire (season 2) episodes
2003 American television episodes
Television episodes written by David Simon